The B postcode area, also known as the Birmingham postcode area, is a group of 79 postcode districts in central England, within 15 post towns. These cover the central portion of the West Midlands (including Birmingham, West Bromwich, Sutton Coldfield, Smethwick, Solihull, Halesowen, Cradley Heath, Oldbury and Rowley Regis), plus northeast Worcestershire (including Bromsgrove and Redditch), north and west Warwickshire (including Alcester, Studley and Henley-in-Arden), and part of southeast Staffordshire (including Tamworth) and a very small part of Leicestershire.



Coverage
The approximate coverage of the postcode districts:

 
! B1
| BIRMINGHAM
| Birmingham City Centre, Broad Street (east)
| Birmingham
|-
! B2
| BIRMINGHAM
| Birmingham City Centre, New Street
| Birmingham
|-
! B3
| BIRMINGHAM
| Birmingham City Centre, Newhall Street
| Birmingham
|-
! B4
| BIRMINGHAM
| Birmingham City Centre, Corporation Street (north)
| Birmingham
|-
! B5
| BIRMINGHAM
| Digbeth, Highgate, Lee Bank, Edgbaston
| Birmingham
|-
! B6
| BIRMINGHAM
| Aston, Birchfield , Witton
| Birmingham
|-
! B7
| BIRMINGHAM
| Nechells, Vauxhall
| Birmingham
|-
! B8
| BIRMINGHAM
| Washwood Heath, Ward End, Saltley
| Birmingham
|-
! B9
| BIRMINGHAM
| Bordesley Green, Bordesley
| Birmingham
|-
! B10
| BIRMINGHAM
| Small Heath
| Birmingham
|-
! B11
| BIRMINGHAM
| Sparkhill, Sparkbrook, Tyseley
| Birmingham
|-
! B12
| BIRMINGHAM
| Balsall Heath, Sparkbrook, Highgate
| Birmingham
|-
! B13
| BIRMINGHAM
| Moseley, Billesley
| Birmingham
|-
! B14
| BIRMINGHAM
| Kings Heath, Yardley Wood, Druids Heath, Highter's Heath, Warstock
| Birmingham
|-
! B15
| BIRMINGHAM
| Edgbaston 
| Birmingham
|-
! B16
| BIRMINGHAM
| Ladywood, Edgbaston
| Birmingham
|-
! B17
| BIRMINGHAM
| Harborne, Edgbaston
| Birmingham
|-
! B18
| BIRMINGHAM
| Winson Green, Hockley
| Birmingham
|-
! B19
| BIRMINGHAM
| Lozells, Newtown, Birchfield
| Birmingham
|-
! B20
| BIRMINGHAM
| Handsworth Wood, Handsworth, Birchfield
| Birmingham
|-
! B21
| BIRMINGHAM
| Handsworth
| Birmingham
|-
! B23
| BIRMINGHAM
| Erdington, Stockland Green, Short Heath, Perry Common
| Birmingham
|-
! B24
| BIRMINGHAM
| Erdington, Wylde Green, Tyburn
| Birmingham
|-
! B25
| BIRMINGHAM
| Yardley, Hay Mills
| Birmingham
|-
! B26
| BIRMINGHAM
| Sheldon, Yardley, Birmingham International Airport
| Birmingham, Solihull
|-
! B27
| BIRMINGHAM
| Acocks Green
| Birmingham
|-
! B28
| BIRMINGHAM
| Hall Green
| Birmingham
|-
! B29
| BIRMINGHAM
| Selly Oak, Bournbrook, Selly Park, Weoley Castle, California (part of)
| Birmingham
|-
! B30
| BIRMINGHAM
| Bournville, Cotteridge, Stirchley, Kings Norton (North)
| Birmingham
|-
! B31
| BIRMINGHAM
| Northfield, Longbridge, West Heath
| Birmingham
|-
! B32
| BIRMINGHAM
| Woodgate, Bartley Green, Quinton, California (part of)
| Birmingham
|-
! B33
| BIRMINGHAM
| Kitts Green, Stechford
| Birmingham
|-
! B34
| BIRMINGHAM
| Shard End, Buckland End
| Birmingham
|-
! B35
| BIRMINGHAM
| Castle Vale
| Birmingham
|-
! B36
| BIRMINGHAM
| Castle Bromwich, Smith's Wood, Bromford, Hodge Hill
| Birmingham, Solihull
|-
! B37
| BIRMINGHAM
| Chelmsley Wood, Marston Green,  Kingshurst,  Fordbridge
| Solihull
|-
! B38
| BIRMINGHAM
| Kings Norton (South),
| Birmingham
|-
! B40
| BIRMINGHAM
| National Exhibition Centre, Birmingham International Airport, Marston Green, Bickenhill
| Solihull
|-
! B42
| BIRMINGHAM
| Perry Barr, Great Barr, Hamstead
| Birmingham
|-
! B43
| BIRMINGHAM
| Great Barr, Hamstead
| Birmingham, Sandwell, Walsall
|-
! B44
| BIRMINGHAM
| Perry Barr, Kingstanding, Great Barr
| Birmingham
|-
! B45
| BIRMINGHAM
| Rednal, New Frankley, Rubery, Cofton Hackett, Barnt Green, Lickey, Longbridge, Northfield (part)
| Birmingham, Bromsgrove 
|-
! B46
| BIRMINGHAM
| Water Orton, Coleshill, Nether Whitacre
| North Warwickshire
|-
! B47
| BIRMINGHAM
| Hollywood, Wythall
| Bromsgrove
|-
! B48
| BIRMINGHAM
| Alvechurch
| Bromsgrove
|-
! B49
| ALCESTER
| Alcester
| Stratford-on-Avon
|-
! B50
| ALCESTER
| Bidford-on-Avon
| Stratford-on-Avon
|-
! B60
| BROMSGROVE
| Bromsgrove (east)
| Bromsgrove
|-
! B61
| BROMSGROVE
| Bromsgrove (west)
| Bromsgrove
|-
! B62
|HALESOWEN
| Halesowen (east), Romsley, Hunnington, Quinton (part)
| Dudley, Bromsgrove, Birmingham
|-
! B63
| HALESOWEN
| Halesowen (west and town centre), Hayley Green, Hasbury
| Dudley, Bromsgrove 
|-
! B64
| CRADLEY HEATH
| Cradley Heath, Old Hill
| Sandwell
|-
! B65
| ROWLEY REGIS
| Rowley Regis, Blackheath
| Sandwell
|-
! B66
| SMETHWICK
| Smethwick (east and north), Bearwood (east)
| Sandwell
|-
! B67
| SMETHWICK
| Smethwick (west), Bearwood (west), Londonderry
| Sandwell
|-
! B68
| OLDBURY
| Langley, Brandhall, Quinton (part of)
| Sandwell
|-
! B69
| OLDBURY
| Oldbury, Tividale
| Sandwell
|-
! B70
| WEST BROMWICH
| West Bromwich (south, west and town centre)
| Sandwell
|-
! B71
| WEST BROMWICH
| West Bromwich (north)
| Sandwell
|-
! B72
| SUTTON COLDFIELD
| Sutton Coldfield town centre, Maney, Wylde Green
| Birmingham
|-
! B73
| SUTTON COLDFIELD
| Boldmere, New Oscott, Wylde Green (part)
| Birmingham
|-
! B74
| SUTTON COLDFIELD
| Four Oaks, Little Aston, Streetly
| Birmingham, Lichfield, Walsall
|-
! B75
| SUTTON COLDFIELD
| Mere Green, Roughley, Moor Hall, Whitehouse Common, Falcon Lodge
| Birmingham
|-
! B76
| SUTTON COLDFIELD
| Walmley, Minworth, Curdworth, Lea Marston
| Birmingham, North Warwickshire
|-
! B77
| TAMWORTH
| Tamworth, Wilnecote, Amington
| Tamworth, North Warwickshire
|-
! B78
| TAMWORTH
| Tamworth, Fazeley, Kingsbury, Polesworth
| Tamworth, North Warwickshire
|-
! B79
| TAMWORTH
| Tamworth, Warton
| Tamworth, North Warwickshire, North West Leicestershire
|-
! B80
| STUDLEY
| Studley
| Stratford-on-Avon
|-
! B90
| SOLIHULL
| Shirley, Solihull Lodge, Major's Green, Dickens Heath, Cheswick Green
| Solihull, Bromsgrove
|-
! B91
| SOLIHULL
| Solihull
| Solihull
|-
! B92
| SOLIHULL
| Olton, Elmdon, Bickenhill, Hampton-in-Arden
| Solihull
|-
! B93
| SOLIHULL
| Baddesley Clinton , Bentley Heath, Dorridge, Knowle, Tilehouse Green
| Solihull
|-
! B94
| SOLIHULL
| Hockley Heath, Earlswood
| Solihull, Warwick
|-
! B95
| HENLEY-IN-ARDEN
| Henley-in-Arden
| Stratford-on-Avon
|-
! B96
| REDDITCH
| Feckenham
| Redditch
|-
! B97
| REDDITCH
| Redditch (west), Callow Hill, Webheath
| Redditch
|-
! B98
| REDDITCH
| Redditch (east), Beoley
| Redditch
|- style="background:#FFFFFF;"
! B99
| BIRMINGHAM
|
| non-geographic 
|}

Notes
The B postcode area as a whole, is the largest by population.
B1 1AA is Birmingham Head Post office; this is no longer in the B1 area, but retains the B1 code. 
B1 1BB is Birmingham Council House

Maps

Former scheme

Before the introduction of postcodes in the 1960s, Birmingham along with other major cities were divided into numbered postal districts. With a few exceptions these were directly incorporated into the outcode (the first part of the postcode).

For example, Great Barr was formerly Birmingham 22 (now B43 and 44) and Smethwick was formerly Smethwick 40 and 41 (now B66 and 67).

See also
List of postcode areas in the United Kingdom
Postcode Address File

References

External links
Royal Mail's Postcode Address File
A quick introduction to Royal Mail's Postcode Address File (PAF)

Geography of Birmingham, West Midlands
Postcode areas covering the West Midlands (region)